Lieutenant-General Alexander James Sanson "Sandy" Storrie,  (born 1962) is a former senior British Army officer who served as Deputy Commander Resolute Support Mission.

Early life and education
Storrie was born in Exeter and educated at Pembroke College, Oxford.

Military career
Storrie was commissioned into the Devonshire and Dorset Regiment on 3 September 1982. He became commanding officer of the Devonshire and Dorset Regiment in 2002 and led the regiment while serving in Northern Ireland. He went on to be commander of 7th Armoured Brigade in 2007 and commanded it in Southern Iraq the following year. After that he became Assistant Chief of the Defence Staff (Military Strategy) in 2011, Deputy Commandant of the Royal College of Defence Studies in October 2013 and Deputy Commander Resolute Support Mission in April 2016.

Honours
Storrie was appointed Commander of the Order of the British Empire (CBE) on 11 September 2009 in recognition of his contribution to Operation Telic XII. He was appointed Companion of the Order of the British Empire (CB) in the 2017 New Year Honours.

References

 

1962 births
Living people
British Army generals
Commanders of the Order of the British Empire
Devonshire and Dorset Regiment officers
Alumni of Pembroke College, Oxford
Companions of the Order of the Bath
Military personnel from Devon